Kees Guyt (14 October 1953 – 30 March 2012) was a Dutch football player and coach.

Career
Guyt began his career as an amateur with VV Katwijk, before playing as a professional with FC Volendam and AZ.

He later became a coach with a number of amateur clubs, including Foreholte, RKAV Volendam, Swift, Blauw-Wit Amsterdam, FC Rijnvogels  and DWV.

Personal life
He was the father of Danny Guijt and uncle to Edwin van der Sar.

References

1953 births
2012 deaths
Footballers from Katwijk
Association football defenders
Dutch footballers
Dutch football managers
FC Volendam players
AZ Alkmaar players
Blauw-Wit Amsterdam managers